This is a list of episodes of Disappeared, a television program broadcast on the Investigation Discovery network that documents missing persons cases. The program was first aired in December 2009, with subsequent series shown through 2013, and, after a three-year hiatus, resumed in 2016 through 2018. A new series began in 2022 following a four-year absence.

Series overview

Episodes
Note: Episode subjects who are still actively missing are linked to their profiles at The Charley Project, a missing persons database. For persons subsequently found alive or deceased, names of subjects are linked to reliable news sources regarding their disappearance and discovery.

Season 1 (2009–2010)

Season 2 (2010)

Season 3 (2011)

Season 4 (2011–2012)

Season 5 (2012)

Season 6 (2012–2013)

Specials (2014–2015)

Season 7 (2016)

Season 8 (2017)

Season 9 (2018)

Season 10 (2022)

See also
List of people who disappeared mysteriously

Notes

References

External links
Official website
Disappeared at TV Guide

Lists of American non-fiction television series episodes
Television series about missing people